The 1937 South Carolina Gamecocks football team was an American football team that represented the University of South Carolina as a member of the Southern Conference (SoCon) during the 1937 college football season. In their third and final season under head coach Don McCallister, the Gamecocks compiled an overall record of 5–6–1 with a mark of 2–2–1 in conference play,plaching seventh in the SoCon.

Schedule

References

South Carolina
South Carolina Gamecocks football seasons
South Carolina Gamecocks football